Petres (before 1926: Πέτερσκον - Peterskon) is a village in Florina Regional Unit, Macedonia, Greece.

The Greek census (1920) recorded 851 people in the village and in 1923 there were 400 inhabitants (or 69 families) who were Muslim. Following the Greek-Turkish population exchange, in 1926 within Peterskon there were refugee families from East Thrace (20), Asia Minor (5) and Pontus (13). The Greek census (1928) recorded 712 village inhabitants. There were 32 refugee families (151 people) in 1928.

References 

Populated places in Florina (regional unit)

Amyntaio